Effigy of the Forgotten is the debut full-length album by New York-based death metal band Suffocation, released in 1991. The cover artwork was created by Dan Seagrave. Several of the tracks had appeared on earlier releases: "Reincremation" and "Involuntary Slaughter" were re-recorded from the Reincremation demo, while "Infecting the Crypts", "Mass
Obliteration", and "Jesus Wept" appeared originally on the Human Waste EP.

Both this album and Pierced from Within have been re-released by Roadrunner Records as part of the Two from the Vault series.

The album was dedicated to the memory of fellow metal band Atheist's bassist Roger Patterson, who had been killed in a car crash earlier in 1991.

Musical style
Effigy of the Forgotten is considered to be a death metal album with a highly sophisticated level of technical proficiency. The guitars, which are tuned to C Standard (four halfsteps down from standard tuning) feature fast palm muted riffing, tremolo picking as well as guitar solos. The drumming involves blast beats and quick fills.

The breakdown riff found in the hook of "Liege of Inveracity" has been credited as the first slam riff in death metal, later inspiring an offshoot of death metal known as slam death metal.

Track listing

Personnel

Suffocation
Frank Mullen – vocals
Terrance Hobbs – lead guitar
Doug Cerrito – rhythm guitar
Josh Barohn – bass
Mike Smith – drums

Guest musician
George "Corpsegrinder" Fisher – guest vocals on "Reincremation" and "Mass Obliteration."

Production
Scott Burns – production, engineering, mixing
Eddy Schreyer – mastering
Dan Seagrave – artwork

References

Suffocation (band) albums
Albums with cover art by Dan Seagrave
Roadrunner Records albums
Albums produced by Scott Burns (record producer)
1991 debut albums